Chlamydastis orion is a moth in the family Depressariidae. It was described by August Busck in 1920. It is found in Guatemala and Colombia.

References

Moths described in 1920
Chlamydastis